Time:matters is a German company specializing in urgent transports and time-critical international shipping. The company is owned by Lufthansa Cargo. Due to exclusive cooperation agreements, time:matters has access to the Lufthansa Group network. The company also has access to the Intercity-Express high-speed railway services of Deutsche Bahn.At Frankfurt International Airport as well as at Munich Airport, time:matters runs its own courier terminals. The company is working in following six different industries:

 Life & Health
 MedTech
 Aviation & Aerospace
 Machinery & Components
 Automotive
 High Tech & Semicon

History and background
In 2002, time:matters was established as a spin-off from Lufthansa Cargo AG. It traded under the name,"Lufthansa Cargo Same Day World GmbH".

In 2003, the company changed its name to "time:matters GmbH". The core business of the company are "Special Speed Solutions" and time-critical shipments on air, rail and, road. In 2003, time:matters, in cooperation with Deutsche Bahn, began sameday shipments via railway. This service is called "ic:kurier".

In 2004, time:matters and United Airlines Cargo agreed upon an intercontinental partnership which enabled time:matters to deliver highly urgent shipments to thirty-nine destinations in the United States.

In 2007, Aheim Capital GmbH became time:matters majority stake holder, with Lufthansa Cargo retaining 49 percent of the company. Furthermore, the "time:matters Spare Parts Logistics GmbH" was established for supplying customers with required spare parts. The year 2007 also saw the opening of the Courier Terminal at Frankfurt Airport.

In 2010, the ic:kurier service opened in Vienna, Austria Paris and, France.

In 2016, Lufthansa Cargo became time:matters only stake holder after buying back 51 percent of the company from Aheim Capital GmbH.

In 2017 the company has launched its digital On Board Courier platform airmates.

In 2018, time:matters expanded its Sameday Air network to the US and Mexiko. The same year, the company received the ISO 14001:2015 environmental certification. In addition to that, it acquires CB Customs Broker GmbH and Customs Broker Cargo Handling GmbH, a customs clearance service. 

In 2019, the company expanded its Sameday air network once again to Asia including China, Japan, Thailand and Singapore. time:matters received the ISO 9001:2015 certification and was awarded the AEO certification. In this year as well, the company started to compensate the  emissions of all airmates Onboard Courier transports.

In 2020, time:matters established a corporate affiliate in the US and built up a US domestic Sameday Air network with 100 stations.

The time:matters headquarter is located in Gutenbergstr, 6, 63263 Neu-Isenburg, Germany. time:matters employs more than 330 people.

Subsidiary companies 
 time:matters Courier Terminals GmbH
 time:matters Austria GmbH
 time:matters Netherlands B.V.
 time:matters Asia Pacific Pte Ltd. 
 time:matters Shanghai International Freight Forwarding Ltd. 
 time:matters Americas, Inc.

External links
 Official Website of time:matters

References

Logistics companies of Germany